Zorochros is a genus of click beetles, found chiefly in sand on the banks of rivers and streams. There are 40 described species belonging to the genus, most of which are native to Eurasia.

Selected species 

 Zorochros coreanus Han, Park I.G. & Park H, 2015
 Zorochros dermestoides Herbst, 1806
 Zorochros dufouri Buysson, 1900
 Zorochros iranicus Dolin, 2002
 Zorochros mansusanensis Han, Park I.G. & Park H, 2015
 Zorochros mesasiaticus Dolin, 1995
 Zorochros titanus Dolin & Cate 1998
 Zorochros yosrae Al Dhafer & Wells, 2016

References

Elateridae genera